Mohammadabad (also Romanized as Moḩammadābād) is a village in Bostan Rural District, Sangan District, Khaf County, Razavi Khorasan Province, Iran. At the 2006 census, its population was 111, in 20 families.

References 

Populated places in Khaf County